Starčević is a South Slavic surname. The surname may refer to:

 Ante Starčević (1823–1896), Croatian politician and writer
 David Starčević (1840–1908), Croatian politician and a lawyer
 Dragan Starčević (born 1977), Serbian footballer
 Mile Starčević (1862–1917), Croatian politician
 Mile Starčević (1904–1953), Croatian politician
 Slobodan Starčević (born 1971), Bosnian Serb football manager
 Šime Starčević (1784–1859), Croatian priest and linguist

See also
 Starcevich

Croatian surnames

Serbian surnames